Wrld or WRLD may refer to:

 WRLD, radio station in Alabama, United States
 Juice Wrld (1998–2019), American rapper, singer, and songwriter

See also
 World (disambiguation)